Lorne David Rombough (born April 2, 1948) is a Canadian former professional ice hockey player.

During the 1973–74 season, Rombough played three games in the World Hockey Association with the Chicago Cougars. He is the brother of NHL player Doug Rombough.

References

External links

1948 births
Living people
Canadian ice hockey left wingers
Charlotte Checkers (SHL) players
Chicago Cougars players
Dayton Gems players
Flint Generals players
Fort Wayne Komets players
Greensboro Generals (EHL) players
Hampton Aces players
Hampton Gulls (SHL) players
Long Island Cougars players
Long Island Ducks (ice hockey) players
Richmond Wildcats players
Rochester Americans players
San Francisco Shamrocks players
Toledo Hornets players